An outdoor sculpture of Nelson Mandela by Jean Doyle is installed outside the Embassy of South Africa, Washington, D.C., in the United States. The  statue was unveiled on September 21, 2013.

See also
 2013 in art

References

External links
 

2013 establishments in Washington, D.C.
2013 sculptures
Embassy Row
Monuments and memorials in Washington, D.C.
Sculptures of men in Washington, D.C.
South Africa–United States relations
Statues in Washington, D.C.
Washington, D.C.